Antony Charles MacRow-Wood (born April 1960) has been the Archdeacon of Dorset since 2015.

Early life
MacRow-Wood was educated at Bishop Wordsworth's School and the University of York; and worked in finance from 1982 to 1989.  He then trained for the priesthood at Westcott House, Cambridge. He was ordained in 1993. He then served his title at St Andrew, Swindon. After this, he was Team Vicar of the Sutton Pyntz Liberty. He was then with the North Poole Ecumenical Team until his appointment as Archdeacon.

References

1960 births
Living people
People educated at Bishop Wordsworth's School
Archdeacons of Dorset
20th-century English Anglican priests
Alumni of Westcott House, Cambridge
Alumni of the University of York